Associazione Sportiva Dilettante Leonessa Altamura is an Italian football club based in Altamura, Apulia. Founded in 2006, icurrently plays in the Eccellenza Apulia. Club's colors are red and white.

Until the 2005–06 season, the club was known as San Paolo Bari, and was based in Bari, Apulia.

References

Association football clubs established in 2006
Football clubs in Apulia
2006 establishments in Italy